West Lothian and Gloucestershire Aerial Archaeology specialises in kite aerial photography (KAP) from the near ultra-violet through to the near and thermal infrared (thermography)

History
West Lothian and Gloucestershire Aerial Archaeology started as the West Lothian Archaeological Trust. It was formed on 19 April 2012 and registered as Scottish Charity No. SC043118 on 26 April 2012, having been known informally, since 2007, as West Lothian (Aerial) Archaeology. The Trust also had an interest in sites in England, especially Gloucestershire. The Trustees were Jim Knowles, Cade, John and Rosie Wells.

In May 2013, the Trust was approved as an associated partner  of ArcheoLandscapes Europe (ArcLand), part of the European Union's Culture Programme, to represent its area of expertise. Also in May, the Trust launched The Scottish National Aerial Photography Scheme (SNAPS - UK and Ireland).

In 2016, the Trust became a member of the successor to ArcLand Europe: ArcLand International.

The Trust reverted to non-charitable status as West Lothian and Gloucestershire Aerial Archaeology in April 2019  and ceased to be a member of ArcLand International.

Work of the Trust
West Lothian Archaeology specialises in kite aerial photography (KAP) from the near ultra-violet through to the near and thermal infrared  (thermography). KAP is one of many techniques of aerial archaeology and was first used in an archaeological context by Henry Wellcome over 100 years ago. For a detailed consideration of kite aerial photography in the near-UV and near-IR, see the online publications of Geert Verhoeven which are listed in the external links below. On-site aerial  photography complements the non-invasive methods of geophysical survey (archaeology) and images can be used to create virtual 3D models and animations.

Kite aerial photography is a simple, cheap, technique. A camera, or phone, is suspended on a kite line about 20m from the kite, on either a Picavet suspension (see Kite aerial photography) or using a simple selfie stick.

The work of the Trust was published on its Armadale Community and Heritage Website.

The Trust initiated a register of specialist kite aerial photographers.

References

External links

 The Public Laboratory for Open Technology and Science
 The Aerial Archaeology Research Group (AARG)
 The International Society for Archaeological Prospection
 The publications of Geert Verhoeven

Archaeological organizations